Zagreb Glavni kolodvor (Croatian for Zagreb main station) is the main railway station in Zagreb, Croatia.

History
An 1890 act of the Royal Hungarian Government authorised the building of the main station and maintenance shop in Zagreb. Sculptural works were undertaken by the Hungarian sculptor Vilim Marschenko. The station opened on 1 July 1892. It is one of the largest public buildings built in 19th century Zagreb.

Reconstruction works were undertaken in 1986–87 (just before the 1987 Summer Universiade) and again in 2006.

Gallery

See also
 Zagreb train disaster
 Zagreb Zapadni railway station

References

Railway stations opened in 1892
Railway stations in Croatia
Buildings and structures in Zagreb
Transport in Zagreb
Donji grad, Zagreb
Ferenc Pfaff railway stations
Neoclassical architecture in Croatia